Chris Abbott (born September 17, 1947) is an American television producer, writer and author. She is a graduate of the University of Oregon, with an MFA from Bennington College in Vermont. She started her career writing for Little House on the Prairie. She also wrote for other primetime series such as B.L. Stryker, Legacy, Bandit: Bandit Goes Country, Revealing Evidence: Stalking The Honolulu Strangler, High Sierra Search And Rescue, Cagney & Lacey, Quantum Leap, Star Trek: Voyager and Star Trek: The Next Generation, and produced and wrote Magnum, P.I. (as Executive Story Consultant), Dr. Quinn, Medicine Woman (as Creative Consultant), and Diagnosis: Murder.

She has worked on the CBS Daytime serials The Bold and the Beautiful and The Young and the Restless. Abbott was nominated for a Daytime Emmy Award for best writing in 2006.

Positions held
The Bold and the Beautiful
Script Writer (2005 – August 2, 2006)

The Young and the Restless
Script Writer (February 27, 2007 – March 22, 2007)
Associate Head Writer (May 25, 2006 – June 20, 2006; January 2, 2007 – February 16, 2007)

Books
Ten Minutes to the Pitch (2005)

Awards and nominations
Daytime Emmy Awards
 Nomination, 2006, Best Writing, The Bold and The Beautiful

References

External links

LMU
2006 Daytime Emmys Nominees
Dr. Quinn Main Crew
Star Trek: Voyager Main Crew
Gaze 1998
Crafty Screenwriting
Magnum P.I. Writers

American soap opera writers
American women television writers
Writers Guild of America Award winners
1947 births
Living people
University of Oregon alumni
Bennington College alumni
Place of birth missing (living people)
Women soap opera writers
21st-century American women writers